The 2011 Kent Predators/Seattle Timberwolves season was the team's second season as a professional indoor football franchise and second in the Indoor Football League (IFL). One of twenty-two teams competing in the IFL for the 2011 season, the Kent, Washington-based Seattle Predators were members of the Pacific Division of the Intense Conference.

Under the leadership of owner, Tom Dowling, general manager Mike Berry and head coach Sean Ponder, the team played their home games at the ShoWare Center in Kent, Washington.

On January 10, 2011, the Kent Predators were sold to Jeffery Scott, who hired new head coach Keith Evans, just two days later. On April 13, the team was sold again, this time to Tom Dowling, changed the team's name to the Seattle Timberwovles while naming Mike Berry the team general manager, and Sean Ponder the team's new head coach.

Schedule
Key:

Standings

Roster

References

Seattle Timberwolves
Seattle Timberwolves
American football in Washington (state)